St George's German Lutheran Church is a church in Alie Street, Whitechapel just to the east of the City of London. From its foundation in 1762 until 1995 it was used by German Lutherans. Today the small vestry serves as an office for the Historic Chapels Trust and the church is available for hire for secular events.

St George's was the fifth Lutheran church to be built in London. It is now the oldest surviving German Lutheran church in the United Kingdom.

Foundation and history
The founder was Dietrich Beckman, a successful sugar boiler who put up half the money required to buy the site and erect the church. Beckman's cousin, Gustav Anton Wachsel from Halberstadt, became the first pastor. At the time, the street was called "Little Ayliffe Street" and the area was called "Goodman's Fields". The name of the street changed to "Alie Street" about 1800. This area of Whitechapel had many sugar refiners of German descent in the nineteenth century and they constituted most of the congregation. From 1853 the churchyard and crypt were closed, and no longer accepted burials.

At its height, there were an estimated 16,000 German Lutherans in Whitechapel and the area was sometimes referred to as Little Germany. St George's Church is the last remaining physical evidence of this major wave of immigration into East London.

The last major influx of Germans to the area was in the 1930s, when, during the Nazi period, the pastor, Julius Rieger, set up a relief centre for Jewish refugees at St George's. The  theologian and anti-Nazi activist Dietrich Bonhoeffer preached here for a brief period in 1935, following the destruction of his own St Paul's church nearby.

The St John and St Croix refugees

In 1763 about 600 Germans from the Palatinate and Würzburg attempted to travel to the Virgin Islands of St John and St Croix. Unfortunately the officer in charge abandoned them in London with no money or resources and no knowledge of English. Gustav Anton Wachsel, Pastor of St George's church appealed for help on their behalf. The Tower of London gave them 200 tents to protect them from the rain, and there were charitable contributions of 600 pounds. King George III intervened and enabled them to travel to Carolina instead.

Interior features
The coat-of-arms of King George III (pre-1801) and two carved timber commandment boards in German hang in the church. The Royal Arms were required to be erected in Anglican churches but were adopted by nonconformist congregations voluntarily, as a mark of loyalty. There are donations boards for the church and adjoining former church school and among the donors listed is the King of Prussia.

The organ was built in 1886 by the Walcker family. They used the organ case of the previous organ (John England, 1794). When the organ was rebuilt in 1937, the case was reused.

Bell tower
The street frontage was crowned by a baroque bell tower in copper-covered timber. This was taken down in the 1930s at the insistence of the District Surveyor as unsafe and has not to date been replaced. A plain brick pediment and cement cross replaced it, somewhat diminishing the architecture of the frontage. The former location of the bell tower can still be discerned in the brickwork. The bell and weathervane from the tower were saved and remain in the church.

Restoration
Having fallen out of use by the congregation it was transferred in 1995 to the Historic Chapels Trust who understood a programme of conservative restoration and repair costing £600,000 generously assisted by English Heritage and a number of private foundations including the St Paul's German Evangelical Church Trust Trust. Work included major roof repairs and delicate repairs to the brick walls which were showing signs of movement. The restoration was supervised by conservation architects Thomas Ford and Partners with structural engineers Alan Baxter Associates.

Current uses 
The church is hired for organ recitals, filming, rehearsals and castings, concerts, occasional acts of worship by various congregations without their own church and for secular events, income from which helps to maintain the structure, as the church is not endowed. The vestry serves as an office of Historic Chapels Trust. The church Committee Room, named the Maezold Zimmer after a former pastor, is available for hire.

Couples eligible to be married in Tower Hamlets may have religious marriages here and ceremonies may be conducted in German, English or Latin.

An active committee of Friends of St George's put on public events at the church and welcome new members.  The church is available for guided group visits by appointment and has regular open days throughout the year.

St George's Church Library & Parish Records

Gustav von Anton's collection of books was kept in the vestry and with later additions to the library, came into the care of the Historic Chapels Trust with the building. They amounted to about 750 books, including early eighteenth-century prints of the Waisenhaus in Halle and Gottfried Keller's Die Leute von Seldwyla. In autumn 1995 an unsuccessful attempted theft prompted the transfer of the books to the British Library where they are catalogued as a special collection and available to students.

Books and microfiches available for baptisms 1763 - 1895 and other parish records for family history research are no longer held at the church but may be consulted at LB Tower Hamlets Central Library

See also
List of chapels preserved by the Historic Chapels Trust

External links
 St George's German Church website of Friends of St Georges
 www.hct.org.uk St Georges German Lutheran Church official website
 History of the Walcker family
 Germans in Whitechapel
 the St John refugees
 The British Library collection of books from St George's
At The Lutheran Church - Spitalfields Life 

Churches completed in 1762
18th-century Lutheran churches
Grade II* listed churches in London
Grade II* listed buildings in the London Borough of Tower Hamlets
Churches in the London Borough of Tower Hamlets
Lutheran churches in London
Churches preserved by the Historic Chapels Trust
Buildings and structures in Whitechapel
18th-century churches in the United Kingdom
Whitechapel